Kinross-shire was a county constituency of the House of Commons of Great Britain from 1708 until 1800, and of the House of Commons of the United Kingdom from 1801 to 1832.

Creation
Kinross-shire was Scotland's second-smallest county. The British parliamentary constituency was created in 1708 following the Acts of Union, 1707 and replaced the former Parliament of Scotland shire constituency of Kinross-shire. Kinross-shire was paired as an alternating constituency with neighbouring Clackmannanshire. The freeholders of Kinross-shire elected one Member of Parliament (MP)  to one Parliament, while those of Clackmannanshire elected a Member to the next.

History
The constituency elected one Member of Parliament (MP) by the first past the post system until the seat was abolished for the 1832 general election.

The Representation of the People (Scotland) Act 1832 abolished the alternating constituencies. Kinross-shire was merged with Clackmannanshire into the single constituency of Clackmannanshire and Kinross-shire, electing one Member between them to each Parliament.

Members of Parliament

References

Historic parliamentary constituencies in Scotland (Westminster)
Constituencies of the Parliament of the United Kingdom established in 1708
Constituencies of the Parliament of the United Kingdom disestablished in 1832